Chao Man Hou (born 21 February 1996) is a Macau swimmer. He competed at the 2015 World Aquatics Championships and the 2017 World Aquatics Championships.

He was the flag bearer for Macau at the 2014 Asian Games opening ceremony in Incheon, South Korea.

Chao graduated from the University of Macau in 2018. At the 2018 Asian Games, he set a new Macau record in the qualifiers for men's 200 metre breaststroke, with a time of 2:15.34, coming in 7th place overall. He is nicknamed "the frog king of Macau" ("frog style" being the literal translation of the Chinese name for the breaststroke).

Major Results

Individual

Relay

References

1996 births
Living people
Macau sportspeople
Asian Games competitors for Macau
Place of birth missing (living people)
Swimmers at the 2014 Asian Games
Swimmers at the 2018 Asian Games
Male breaststroke swimmers
University of Macau alumni